B (B-flat), or, in some European countries, B, is the eleventh step of the Western chromatic scale (starting from C).
It lies a diatonic semitone above A and a chromatic semitone below B, thus being enharmonic to A, even though in some musical tunings, B will have a different sounding pitch than A. B-flat is also enharmonic to C (C-double flat).

When calculated in equal temperament with a reference of A above middle C as 440 Hz, the frequency of the B above middle C is approximately 466.164 Hz. See pitch (music) for a discussion of historical variations in frequency.

While orchestras tune to an A provided by the oboist, wind ensembles usually tune to a B-flat provided by a tuba, horn, or clarinet.

In Germany, Russia, Poland and Scandinavia, this pitch is designated B, with 'H' used to designate the B-natural. Since the 1990s, B-flat is often denoted Bb or "Bess" instead of B in Swedish music textbooks. Natural B is called B by Swedish jazz and pop musicians, but still denoted H in classical music. See B (musical note) and Musical note#Note names and their history for explanations.

Designation by octave

Scales

Common scales beginning on B
 B-flat major: B C D E F G A B
 B-flat natural minor: B C D E F G A B
 B-flat harmonic minor: B C D E F G A B
 B-flat melodic minor ascending: B C D E F G A B
 B-flat melodic minor descending: B A G F E D C B

Diatonic scales
 B Ionian: B C D E F G A B
 B Dorian: B C D E F G A B
 B Phrygian: B C D E F G A B
 B Lydian: B C D E F G A B
 B Mixolydian: B C D E F G A B
 B Aeolian: B C D E F G A B
 B Locrian: B C D E F G A B

Jazz melodic minor
 B ascending melodic minor: B C D E F G A B
 B Dorian ♭2: B C D E F G A B
 B Lydian augmented: B C D E F G A B
 B Lydian dominant: B C D E F G A B
 B Mixolydian ♭6: B C D E F G A B
 B Locrian ♮2: B C D E F G A B
 B altered: B C D E F G A B

See also
 Piano key frequencies
 :Category:B-flat instruments
 Root (chord)

Musical notes

sv:Ton (ljud)#B, H och Bess